Mark Miravalle (born 1959) is a professor of theology at Franciscan University of Steubenville, specializing in Mariology.  He is president of Vox Populi Mariae Mediatrici, a Catholic movement promoting the concepts of the Blessed Virgin Mary as Mediatrix and Co-Redemptrix.

Life
Mark Miravalle was born in 1959 in San Francisco, where he attended Catholic schools. He made his undergraduate studies in theology as a student in the St. Ignatius Institute (Catholic Great Books program) of the University of San Francisco. Miravalle was married in 1981. He continued his studies at the Pontifical University of St. Thomas Aquinas Angelicum in Rome where he earned a Licentiate of Sacred Theology and  a Doctor of Sacred Theology. In 1984 he and his wife made a pilgrimage to Medjugorje. The following year, Miravalle wrote his doctoral dissertation on The message of Medjugorje : a post conciliar formulation of Lourdes and Fatima on the message of the alleged Marian apparitions at Medjugorje.

Career
As of 2009,  Miravalle holds the rank of Professor of Theology at Franciscan University, where he has taught since 1986, and where he has received several teaching awards. His areas of specialization are Mariology and spiritual theology. In 2018, Miravalle was named St. John Paul II Chair of Mariology at Franciscan University.

Mariological activities
Miravalle is a member of the Mariological Society of America and the Ecumenical Society of the Blessed Virgin Mary, U.S.A. In the preface to Miravalle's book Introduction Mary Cardinal Edouard Gagnon stated that Mark Miravalle is "internationally renowned for his unquestioned fidelity to the Church's Magisterium and for his outstanding scholarship".

Miravalle is president of Vox Populi Mariae Mediatrici, a Roman Catholic movement which seeks the solemn papal definition of the Spiritual Maternity of the Mother of God, the Blessed Virgin Mary, as Co-Redemptrix, Mediatrix of All Graces, and Advocate for the People of God.

Miravalle has given numerous international lectures in Mariology, has addressed several Catholic bishops' conferences, and has served members of the episcopal hierarchy with preliminary investigations for reported apparitions.

Miravalle publishes a bi-monthly Marian e-zine, Mother of All Peoples.

Media appearances
Miravalle has made numerous appearances on Catholic television and radio for EWTN,  the Apostolate for Family Consecration, National Family Catholic Radio, and Air Maria, the media project of the Franciscan Friars of the Immaculate.

He has been interviewed for CNN Latin America, BBC, Fox News, and the NBC series Dateline.

Works 
Mark Miravalle has written and edited numerous books and articles in the areas of Mariology and Marian private revelation.   He is also a contributor to National Catholic Register and Inside the Vatican.

Articles
 New Catholic Encyclopedia, entry “Medjugorje,” 1989

Books
 The Message of Medjugorje: The Marian Message to the Modern World, University Press of America, 1985
 Heart of the Message of Medjugorje, Franciscan University Press, 1988
 Medjugorje and the Family, Helping Families to Live the Message, Franciscan University Press, 1991
 Mary: Coredemptrix, Mediatrix, Advocate, Queenship Publishing, 1993
 Mary, Coredemptrix, Mediatrix, Advocate: Theological Foundations II, Queenship Publishing, 1997
 The Dogma and the Triumph, Queenship Publishing, 1998
 Contemporary Insights on a Fifth Marian Dogma: Mary Co-redemptrix, Mediatrix, Advocate, Theological Foundations III, Queenship Publishing, 2000;
 Mary Co-redemptrix: Doctrinal Issues Today, Queenship Publishing, 2002
 Present Ecclesial Status of Devotion St Philomena, Queenship Publishing, 2002;
 In Continued Dialogue with the Czestochowa Commission, Queenship Publishing, 2002;
 “With Jesus”: The Story of Mary Co-redemptrix, Queenship Publishing, 2003;
 Introduction to Mary: The Heart of Marian Doctrine and Devotion, Queenship Publishing, 2006;
 Private Revelation: Discerning with the Church, Queenship Publishing, 2007
 The Seven Sorrows of China, Queenship Publishing, 2007
 Meet Mary: Getting to Know the Mother of God, Sophia Institute Press, 2008
 Mariology: A Guide for Priests, Deacons, Seminarians, and Consecrated Persons, Queenship Publishing, 2008 (editor)

See also 

 Co-Redemptrix
 Roman Catholic Mariology

Notes

External links 

 Vox Populi Mariae Mediatrici
 Mother of All Peoples e-zine
 Official web site
 Video talks at airmaria.com

Catholic Mariology
American Roman Catholics
University of San Francisco alumni
Franciscan University of Steubenville faculty
Living people
1959 births